KMVR (104.9 FM, "Magic 104.9") is a radio station licensed to serve Mesilla Park, New Mexico.  The station is owned by Bravo Mic Communications, LLC.  It airs a hot adult contemporary music format featuring artists such as Nelly Furtado, Duran Duran, The Fray, The Cure, Green Day, Madonna, Lifehouse, and others. Its sister stations are KOBE, KVLC, KXPZ. KMVR-FM broadcasts on 104.9 from Mesilla Park NM.  The Format is Hot Mod AC and has the slogan "Your Favorite Music" The core artists include Adele, Maroon 5, Bruno Mars, Kelly Clarkson, Train & fun.  Its studios and transmitter are located separately in Las Cruces.

The station was assigned the KMVR call letters by the Federal Communications Commission on May 18, 1987.

References

External links
KMVR official website
Bravo Mic Communications

MVR
Hot adult contemporary radio stations in the United States